4th Cavalry, 4th Cavalry Division, 4th Cavalry Brigade or 4th Cavalry Regiment may refer to:

Corps
 IV Cavalry Corps (Grande Armée)
 IV Cavalry Corps (German Empire)
 4th Cavalry Corps (Soviet Union)

Divisions
 4th Light Cavalry Division (France)
 4th Cavalry Division (German Empire)
 1st Indian Cavalry Division, which was designated the 4th Cavalry Division from November 1916 to March 1918 in France
 4th Cavalry Division (India)
 4th Cavalry Division (Soviet Union), see

Brigades
 4th Cavalry Brigade (Australia)
 4th (Lucknow) Cavalry Brigade, of the Indian Army from September 1920 to 1923
 4th (Meerut) Cavalry Brigade, of the Indian Army in the First World War
 4th (Secunderabad) Cavalry Brigade, of the Indian Army in the Second World War
 4th Cavalry Brigade (Imperial Japanese Army)
 4th Cavalry Brigade (Poland)
 4th Cavalry Brigade (United Kingdom)
 4th Cavalry Brigade (United States)

Regiments
 4th Cavalry Regiment (Australia)
 4th Cavalry (India), a regiment of the Indian Army
 4th Cavalry (Pakistan), an armoured regiment of the Pakistan Army
 4th Cavalry Regiment (United States)
 4th Arkansas Cavalry Regiment, a Confederate regiment of the American Civil War
 4th Arkansas Cavalry Regiment (Union), a Union regiment of the American Civil War
 4th Iowa Cavalry Regiment, a Union regiment of the American Civil War
 4th Kentucky Cavalry Regiment (Union), a Union regiment of the American Civil War
 4th Michigan Cavalry Regiment, a Union regiment of the American Civil War
 4th Ohio Cavalry Regiment, a Union regiment of the American Civil War
 4th Pennsylvania Cavalry Regiment, a Union regiment of the American Civil War
 4th South Carolina Cavalry Regiment, a Confederate regiment of the American Civil War
 4th Virginia Cavalry Regiment, a Confederate regiment of the American Civil War